Binsted is a surname. Notable people with the surname include:

Kim Binsted, American computer scientist
Norman S. Binsted (1890–1961), American Methodist missionary bishop

See also 
 Binsted
 Binsted, West Sussex
 Jack Binstead (born 1996), English actor, comedian, and retired athlete